Olena Oleksandrivna Vaneeva (born 28 June 1982, Dnipro) is a Ukrainian mathematician and researcher and vice head of the Institute of Mathematics, National Academy of Sciences of Ukraine. Her interests include group analysis of differential equations and integrable systems, and partial differential equations.

Life and work 
Vaneeva graduated with a silver medal from Dnipropetrovsk Secondary School in 1999 and enrolled at the Faculty of Mechanics and Mathematics of the Dnipro National University, graduating in 2004.  She earned her PhD in Mathematical Physics (2008) with her dissertation titled Group classification and nonclassical symmetries of reaction-diffusion equations under the direction of R.O. Popovych. She finished her post-doctoral habilitation, also with Popovych, in 2020.

Vaneeva has also collaborated with researchers at the University of Cyprus in Nicosia, in the department of mathematics and statistics working on group analysis of differential equations.

Since 2007, she has been working in Kyiv at the Ukrainian Institute of Mathematics and in 2021 became a leading researcher.

She is on the editorial board of the Ukrainian Mathematical Journal.

Awards 
 2010 - Prize of the President of Ukraine for young scientists for a series of articles "Algebraic methods in mathematical physics."
 2014 - Abel Visiting Scholar Grant from the Niels Henrik Abel Board.
 2018 - Ukrainian award L'ORÉAL-UNESCO "For Women in Science."
 2020 - International Rising Talents - awarded to young researchers as part of the L'ORÉAL-UNESCO Award for Women in Science.
 2020 - winner of the National Award "Woman of Ukraine" 2020 in the category "Science".

Selected publications 
 Vaneeva, Olena O., A. G. Johnpillai, R. O. Popovych, and Christodoulos Sophocleous. "Enhanced group analysis and conservation laws of variable coefficient reaction–diffusion equations with power nonlinearities." Journal of Mathematical Analysis and Applications 330, no. 2 (2007): 1363-1386.
 Vaneeva, Olena O., Roman O. Popovych, and Christodoulos Sophocleous. "Enhanced group analysis and exact solutions of variable coefficient semilinear diffusion equations with a power source." Acta applicandae mathematicae 106, no. 1 (2009): 1-46.
 Vaneeva, Olena O., R. O. Popovych, and Christodoulos Sophocleous. "Extended group analysis of variable coefficient reaction–diffusion equations with exponential nonlinearities." Journal of Mathematical Analysis and Applications 396, no. 1 (2012): 225-242.
 Vaneeva, Olena O., Alexander Bihlo, and Roman O. Popovych. "Generalization of the algebraic method of group classification with application to nonlinear wave and elliptic equations." Communications in Nonlinear Science and Numerical Simulation 91 (2020): 105419.

References 

Living people
1982 births
21st-century Ukrainian scientists
21st-century Ukrainian mathematicians
21st-century Ukrainian women
Ukrainian women mathematicians
People from Dnipropetrovsk Oblast